Swaim is an unincorporated community in northern Jackson County, Alabama, United States.

History
The community was probably named after the family of Moses Swaim, who was an early settler of the area.  A post office operated under the name Swaim from 1910 to 1955.

References

Unincorporated communities in Alabama
Unincorporated communities in Jackson County, Alabama